The Drifter is a 1973 Australian TV series shot in Western Australia.

References

English-language television shows
1973 Australian television series debuts
Australian drama television series